Caulerpella is a genus of green algae in the family Caulerpaceae.

References

External links

Ulvophyceae genera
Caulerpaceae